Hans L. Zetterberg (3 May 1927 - 28 November 2014) was a Swedish sociologist.

Education 
He studied at Uppsala University and the University of Minnesota and received an honorary doctorate from Umeå University
Zetterberg worked at Columbia University 1953-1964; he was Barney Glaser's doctoral advisor.

Publications
Zetterberg, Hans Lennart. On Theory and Verification in Sociology. New Jersey: Bedminster Press, 1966.(3rd edition) According to WorldCat, the book is held in 830  libraries
Zetterberg, Hans Lennart. Sociology in the United States of America; A Trend Report. Westport, Conn: Greenwood Press, 1973.
Zetterberg, Hans Lennart. Sociological Endeavor. Milton: Routledge, 2018. 
Zetterberg, Hans Lennart. Museums and Adult Education. New York: A.M. Kelley for the International Council of Museums, 1969.
Zetterberg, Hans Lennart, and Graham Fennell. Sexual Life in Sweden. 2021.

References 

Swedish sociologists
1927 births
2014 deaths
University of Minnesota alumni
Uppsala University alumni